Mecistocephalus gracilis is a species of centipede in the Mecistocephalidae family. It is endemic to Australia, and was first described in 1925 by German myriapodologist Karl Wilhelm Verhoeff.

Description
This species ranges from 34 mm to 39 mm in length and has 47 pairs of legs.

Distribution
The species occurs in the Kimberley district of far north Western Australia.

Behaviour
The centipedes are solitary terrestrial predators that inhabit plant litter and soil.

References

 

 
gracilis
Centipedes of Australia
Endemic fauna of Australia
Fauna of Western Australia
Animals described in 1925
Taxa named by Karl Wilhelm Verhoeff